Ivan Gladstone "Mike" Mitchell (July 9, 1893 — May 8, 1942) was a Canadian professional ice hockey goaltender who played three seasons in the National Hockey League for the Toronto St. Patricks. Prior to playing in the NHL Mitchell played the 1914–15 season with the Portland Rosebuds of the PCHA. In 1922, Mitchell was injured during the second game of the season and missed the rest of the season. He is still credited with winning the Stanley Cup that season.

Military duty
Between 1915 and 1919 Mitchell was on military duty, fighting with the Canadian forces in World War 1. A notice in the Vancouver Daily World on November 19, 1917 claimed Mitchell had succumbed to his wounds in a London hospital, but the information turned out to be inaccurate as he was still alive.

Mitchell died on May 8, 1942 in his hometown of Winnipeg.

Career statistics

Regular season and playoffs

References

External links

1893 births
1942 deaths
Canadian ice hockey goaltenders
Portland Rosebuds players
Ice hockey people from Winnipeg
Stanley Cup champions
Toronto St. Pats players